The discography of Paul Weller, a successful solo artist previously a member of The Jam and The Style Council, consists of sixteen studio albums, five live albums, thirty-nine singles (not including re-releases or collaborations) and three extended plays (EPs).

Paul Weller's first solo release was "Into Tomorrow", released under the banner of The Paul Weller Movement. Despite a modest performance in the UK Singles Chart, the subsequent "Uh Huh, Oh Yeh" broke into the Top 20. Renewed interest in his work in the Britpop era resulted in 1995's Stanley Road providing his first two solo top ten singles. Weller's album chart performance has been especially strong, with five number one and seven number two albums. He has also scored five top ten and nineteen top twenty singles. He has also achieved significant chart activity in Japan.

Discography

Studio albums

Notes

Live albums

Compilation albums

EPs

Singles

Videos and DVDs
 Live at the Brixton Academy (1991)
 Highlights & Hang Ups (1993)
 Live Wood (1994)
 Live at the Royal Albert Hall (2000)
 Live in Hyde Park (2001)
 Paul Weller: Later... with Jools Holland (2002)
 Live at Braehead (2003)
 Modern Classics on Film: 1990–2001 (2004)
 Studio 150 (2004)
 As is Now (2005)
 Hit Parade (2006)
 Weller at the BBC (2008)
 Just a Dream: "22 Dreams" Live (2009)
 Find the Torch, Burn the Plans (2011)

Other appearances

References

Discographies of British artists
Rock music discographies
Folk music discographies